The 1988–89 season saw Rochdale compete in their 15th consecutive season in the Football League Fourth Division.

Statistics
																																
																																

|}

Final League Table

Competitions

Football League Fourth Division

F.A. Cup

League Cup (Littlewoods Challenge Cup)

Associate Members' Cup (Sherpa Vans Trophy)

Lancashire Cup

Rose Bowl

References

Rochdale A.F.C. seasons
Rochdale